The North Western State Railway (NWR) was formed in January 1886 from the merger of the Scinde, Punjab & Delhi Railway, the Indus Valley State Railway, the Punjab Northern State Railway, the eastern section of the Sind–Sagar Railway and the southern section of the Sind–Pishin State Railway and the Kandahar State Railway.

History 

The military and strategic concerns for securing the border with Afghanistan were such that, Francis Langford O'Callaghan (who was posted from the state railways as engineer-in-chief) was called upon for a number of demanding railway projects, surveys and constructions in the Northwest Frontier. What initially started off as military and strategic railway project, ended up becoming part of the North Western State Railway network upon its formation in 1886. The Bolan Pass railway was completed in 1886 and in 1887 the Khawaja Amran Railway Survey included the Khojak Tunnel and the Chaman Extension Railway. The Khojak Tunnel opened in 1891 and the railway reached Chaman near the Afghan border. By 1905, it was the longest railway under one administration and the strategic railway of the entire Northwest frontier. In 1947, much of the North Western State Railway fell in Pakistan territory domain and became part of the Pakistan Western Railways, while railways in Indian territory became incorporated into the Eastern Punjab Railway.

Mergers
The North Western State Railway network was formed by merging several major and minor railways together. These included:

Major railways absorbed
 Scinde, Punjab & Delhi Railway
 Indus Valley State Railway
 Punjab Northern State Railway
 Sind–Sagar Railway
 Sind–Pishin State Railway
 Kandahar State Railway
 Trans–Baluchistan Railway

Minor railways absorbed
 Quetta Link Railway, opened in 1887
 Jammu–Sialkot Railway, opened in 1897
 Kasur–Lodhran Railway, opened in 1909, dismantled in 1917 and rebuilt in 1922
 Shorekot Road–Chichoki Railway, opened in 1910
 Trans–Indus Railway, opened 1913
 Sialkot–Narowal Railway, opened in 1915
 Shahdara Bagh–Narowal Railway, opened in 1926

Construction
The North Western State Railway undertook a major railway expansion program, which included:

Amritsar–Patti Railway, opened in 1906 and extended to Kasur in 1910
Bahawalnagar–Fort Abbas Railway, opened in 1928 and financed by the Princely Bahawalpur State
Mari Indus Railway, opened in 1913
Bannu Railway, under survey in 1909 but never constructed
Dandot Light Railway, opened in 1905 to serve the Khewra Salt Mine
Hyderabad–Badin Railway, opened in 1905, dismantled in 1917 and rebuilt in 1922
Jacobabad–Kashmore Railway, opened in 1911
Mari–Attock Railway, opened in 1891
Kotri–Rohri Railway, opened in 1900 following the completion of Kotri Bridge in 1899
Khanai–Hindubagh Railway, opened in 1921
Khanpur–Chachran Railway, opened in 1911 and financed by the Princely State of Bahawalpur
Khushalgarh–Kohat–Thal Railway
Khyber Pass Railway, opened in 1925 as a strategic line to Afghanistan
Larkana–Jacobabad Light Railway, opened in 1921
Mandra–Bhaun Railway, opened in 1915
Mushkaf–Bolan Railway
Nowshera–Dargai Railway, opened in 1901
Patti–Kasur Railway, opened in 1909
Sirhind–Rupar Railway, opened in 1927
Wazirabad–Multan Railway, opened in 1899
Zhob Valley Railway, opened in 1921

Rolling stock 

1899 the North Western State Railway owned 602 steam locomotives, 2121 coaches and 10312 goods wagons. In 1906 a steam motor coach from Vulcan Foundry was purchased. By 1936, the rolling stock had increased to 1332 locomotives, 18 railcars, 1494 coaches and more than 30.000 freight wagons.

Classification
It was labeled as a Class I railway according to Indian Railway Classification System of 1926.

See also 
History of rail transport in Pakistan
Pakistan Railways
Scinde, Punjab & Delhi Railway
North Western Railway School
Jhandi railway station, an abandoned city station on a narrow gauge track in Kohat

References

External links 
 "British Library Archives and Manuscripts Catalogue"  - Search;  Retrieved  30 May 2016
  "Grace’s Guide";  Retrieved  30 May 2016
"National Archives from  the RAIL collection";  Retrieved  30 May 2016
North Western Railway Magazine - Monthly staff magazine. Some editorial content published in Urdu . No BL holdings. 2 copies (November 1942, December 1945) are held in the Berridge Papers, Cambridge South Asian Archive.
 Picture of the teachers and students of St. Andrew School, Pakistan Railways (then NWR) at Lahore, set up in the late 19th century panoramio.com
Berridge, Percy Stuart Attwood. Couplings to the Khyber: the story of the North Western Railway. Newton Abbot: David & Charles, 1969.
Terry Case, North Western Railway. Includes a section about Hal Waters (refer photograph album above)
"History of Northern Railway", Northern Railway.
Quetta to Lahore by Rail 1925 All Things Pakistan, now an archived website
 "Breakup of the North Western Railway and the Anglo-Indian community" by Kenneth Hugh Staynor. indiaofthepast.org
Images of British Steam Locomotives used by North Western Railways Ghilzai:panoramio.com (part of this collection)
An old photograph of a Railway Inspection trolley with removable sailboard used on NWR Hyderabad-Kotri, Sindh, Pakistan. Ghilzai:panoramio.com (part of this collection)
Photograph of Troops travelling by train taken by  Private J W Linley of the 2nd Battalion, The Northamptonshire Regiment compiled whilst serving in India 1923-1938. flickr.com/photos/northampton_museum
Some railway personnel in 1898. Page 179 Quarterly Civil List for the Punjab: Corrected up to 1st October 1898 Archive.org

Defunct railway companies of Pakistan
Defunct railway companies of India